Livers Ain’t Cheap (also known as The Real Thing) is a 1996 crime film  written and directed  by James Merendino and  starring James Russo, Jeremy Piven, Emily Lloyd, Fabrizio Bentivoglio, Ashley Lawrence, Esai Morales, Gary Busey & Rod Steiger.

Plot
Rupert Little is an ex-con, has decided to go straight. His little brother James wants to pursue a life of delinquency. After being released from jail, James tells Rupert that while he was in jail, he overheard Dexter, a criminal who was arrested for a purse snatching incident, tells his friend Collin that he plans to heist a nightclub on New Year's Eve. But when James is suddenly gunned down by Collin, who wanted him out of the way, he lies in a hospital bed. When Rupert arrives at the hospital, he learns that James needs a liver transplant. Determined to save him, Rupert decides to execute the heist himself to get the money he needs. After Rupert quits his job, he assembles a crew of ex-cons, including Dexter who had to break out of prison, his best friend John & his ex-girlfriend Lisa Turtle. On the night of the heist, Rupert & his gang enter the nightclub for a climax showdown that spins out of control.

Cast
James Russo as Rupert Little 
Jeremy Piven as John 
Fabrizio Bentivoglio as Alfredo Donati 
Robert LaSardo as Eric Fidel
Ashley Laurence as Carla
Emily Lloyd as Lisa Tuttle
 Dave Buzzotta as James Little
Rod Steiger as Victor
Pat Gallagher as Dexter  
Esai Morales as Collin
Gary Busey as Foreman
Max Perlich as Tom
 Barbara Nickell as Bartender
James Wardlaw as Magnus

Production
Principal photography began on July 1, 1995 & lasted for 30 days. Filming took place in & around Los Angeles, California. The prison breakout scene was filmed at the Old Montana Prison in Deer Lodge, Montana. Filming at the prison began on the evening of July 20. Part of the area was cordoned off for filming. The crew used a one camera movement for filming the character Dexter climbing from the prison wall, dressed as a guard, walking out from the gate, across the bridge & into a car. Filming at the prison was finished in the early morning hours on July 21. After that, the cast and crew went back to Los Angeles and filming wrapped in late July.

Released
Livers Ain't Cheap was released at the Palm Springs Film Festival on January 12, 1996.

Home Video
The film was released on VHS on January 13, 1998. Instead of using the original title, it was released under the new title The Real Thing.

References

External links

1990s crime action films
American crime action films
Films directed by James Merendino
1990s English-language films
1990s American films